George Thomson (1757–1851), born at Limekilns, Fife, Scotland, was a noted collector of the music of Scotland, a music publisher, and a friend of Robert Burns. He was clerk to the board of trustees in Edinburgh for 60 years. His A Select Collection of Original Scottish Airs for the Voice came out in six volumes between 1793 and 1841, and included contributions from Burns,  Lord Byron, Thomas Moore, Walter Scott and Thomas Campbell. Thomson published folksong arrangements by Joseph Haydn, Ludwig van Beethoven, Ignaz Pleyel, Leopold Kozeluch, Johann Nepomuk Hummel, Carl Maria von Weber, Henry Rowley Bishop, and Robert Archibald Smith.

Early life
His father was the schoolmaster at Limekilns, Dunfermline, and he had some legal training. In 1780 he gained a clerical appointment with the Board of Trustees for the Encouragement of Art and Manufactures in Scotland on the recommendation of John Home, and spent the rest of his career with this body set up under the Treaty of Union to promote Scottish trade with money given by Parliament in compensation for losses in the Darien Scheme and for taking on a share of England's national debt, eventually becoming Chief Clerk. He joined the Edinburgh Musical Society, playing the violin in the orchestra and singing in the choir. For 59 years he worked for the Board of Trustees for the Encouragement of Art and Manufactures in Scotland. His daughter Georgina was the wife of editor and music publisher George Hogarth, and his granddaughter  Catherine married the novelist Charles Dickens.

Collection of Scots songs
Thomson played in the orchestra of the St Cecilia Concerts, enjoying performances of Scots songs by Italian castrati visiting Scotland. This gave him the idea of bringing out a collection of Scots songs with new accompaniments and respectable words. In the summer of 1792 he got Andrew Erskine, younger brother of the composer the Earl of Kellie, to take part in the project, but about fifteen months later Erskine, with gambling debts, ended his life by jumping into the Firth of Forth.

To continue the project Thomson asked Alexander Cunningham for a letter of introduction to Robert Burns and in September 1792 sent it with his letter stating that 

Burns was already a contributor to James Johnson's The Scots Musical Museum and agreed to do the work, but indignantly added that "In the honest enthusiasm with which I embark in your undertaking, to talk of money, wages, fee, hire, etc. could be downright Sodomy of Soul! A proof of each of the Songs that I compose or amend, I shall receive as a favour."

Select Scottish Airs
The first part of Thomson's Select Scottish Airs, brought out in June 1793, contained 25 songs by Burns. Thomson sent him a copy and, with the note that "you must suffer me to enclose a small mark of my gratitude, and to repeat it–afterwards when I find it convenient" a five-pound note. Burns responded indignantly 

Thomson did not attempt again to make payments until, close to the end of his life, the dying poet desperately begged him for a further five pounds.

Burns gave his congratulations on the elegant appearance of the book, and Thomson soon decided, with the aid of his willing collaborator, to include "every Scottish air and song worth singing".

Burns kept on providing songs until a few days before his death, and became involved in a lot of correspondence with Thomson, responding to editorial suggestions and justifying reasons for altering an old song or writing a new song to a particular tune. This gives a valuable insight into his approach to Scots song. Once Burns had stated his wishes Thomson rarely argued back, but sometimes made alterations without consulting the poet and ignored the request of Burns to return unsuitable songs for Johnson to put into print. Burns made it clear that in giving one edition of his songs he was not giving away his copyright. Alternative English language versions of the songs were provided by John Wolcot under the pen name of "Peter Pindar", but after he withdrew in August 1793 Thomson persuaded Burns to produce the English verses as well as his Scots language lyrics.

Thomson frequently suggested "improvements" which Burns rejected. A particular instance was Scots Wha Hae where Thomson insisted on an alternative to the familiar tune, and had Burns alter his stanzas to suit, but was later forced by public pressure to restore the original version.

Burns wrote:

See also
 Jean Lorimer (Chloris)

References

Further reading
McCue, Kirsteen (2003) "«The most intricate bibliographical enigma»: understanding George Thomson (1757-1851) and his collections of national airs", in: Richard Turbet, ed. Music Librarianship in the United Kingdom Aldershot: Ashgate; pp. 99–119

External links
Beethoven and George Thomson.

Robert Burns Country – Thomson, George.

1757 births
1851 deaths
Scottish music
People from Fife
Scottish musicologists
Scottish literature
Robert Burns
Scottish song collectors
Scottish folk-song collectors